Chris(topher) Royal, Chris Royal, or Royle may refer to:

Christopher Royal, athlete
Chris Royal (music producer)
Chris Royal (cookbook author)